David Nuyoma (born 3 June 1963) is Chairman of the Namibian Stock Exchange. 

He became CEO of the Government Institutions Pensions Fund Namibia (GIPF) on 1 January 2013, having previously been CEO of the Development Bank of Namibia from November 2003 to December 2012.

He was educated at the University of East Anglia (BA; MA Industrial Development).

References

1963 births
Living people
Alumni of the University of East Anglia
People from Windhoek